Scalped is an American television pilot episode developed by Doug Jung and Geoff Johns for WGN America. It is an adaptation of the comic book series Scalped created by Jason Aaron and R. M. Guéra, and published by DC Comics under their Vertigo imprint.

Premise
"Scalped is a modern-day crime story set in the world of a Native American Indian reservation, and explores power, loyalty, and spirituality in a community led by the ambitious Chief Lincoln Red Crow, as he reckons with Dashiell Bad Horse who has returned home after years away from the reservation."

Cast and characters
The pilot episode featured an all Native American cast: 
 Alex Meraz as Dashiell Bad Horse: His return sets him on a violent path of self-discovery about his place on the Rez and on a collision course with both his estranged mother and Red Crow.
 Gil Birmingham as Chief Lincoln Red Crow: A Lakota elder involved in every aspect of life on the reservation 
 Irene Bedard as Gina Bad Horse: A legendary activist and Dashiell's mother
 Chaske Spencer as Sheriff Falls Down
 Forrest Goodluck as Dino Poor Bear

In February 2017, Lily Gladstone was cast as Carol Red Crow, intended as a recurring role.

Production
In 2014 it was reported that WGN America was developing a live action TV show based on the Vertigo comic book series." The Pilot order was given on March 7, 2016. In February 2017, Bilall Fallah and Adil El Arbi started directing the pilot. The pilot started filmed in New Mexico in early April 2017, but in November, after WGN saw the pilot episode, they decided to pass on the series.

Episodes

References

External links

English-language television shows
DC Comics television episodes
Unaired television pilots
Television shows about Native Americans